1,1-Dichloro-1-fluoroethane is a haloalkane with the formula . It is one of the three  isomers of dichlorofluoroethane.  It belongs to the hydrochlorofluorocarbon (HCFC) family of man-made compounds that contribute significantly to both ozone depletion and global warming when released into the environment.

Physiochemical properties 
1,1-Dichloro-1-fluoroethane can be a non-flammable, colourless liquid under room-temperature atmospheric conditions.  The compound is very volatile with a boiling point of 32°C.  Its critical temperature is near 204°C. Its smell has been described as "usually ethereal" (like ether).

Production and use 
1,1-Dichloro-1-fluoroethane is mainly used as a solvent and foam blowing agent under the names R-141b and HCFC-141b.  It is a class 2 ozone depleting substance undergoing a global phaseout from production and use under the Montreal Protocol since the late 1990s.  It is being replaced by HFCs within some applications.

Environmental effects 

The concentration of HCFC-141b in the atmosphere grew to near 25 parts per trillion by year 2016.   It has an ozone depletion potential (ODP) of 0.12.  This is low compared to the ODP=1 of trichlorofluoromethane (CFC-11, R-11), which also grew about ten times more abundant in the atmosphere prior to introduction of HFC-141b and subsequent adoption of the Montreal Protocol.  

HFC-141b is also a minor but potent greenhouse gas.  It has an estimated lifetime of about 10 years and a 100-year global warming potential ranging 725 to 2500.  This compares to the GWP=1 of carbon dioxide, which had a much greater atmospheric concentration near 400 parts per million in year 2020.

See also 
 IPCC list of greenhouse gases
 List of refrigerants

References 

Hydrochlorofluorocarbons
Halogenated solvents
Refrigerants
Greenhouse gases